Opytnoy plodovo-yagodnoy stantsii is a rural locality (a settlement) and the administrative center of Podgorenskoye Rural Settlement, Rossoshansky District, Voronezh Oblast, Russia. The population was 354 as of 2010.

References 

Rural localities in Rossoshansky District